LUMI (Large Unified Modern Infrastructure) is a petascale supercomputer located at the CSC data center in Kajaani, Finland. , the computer is the fastest supercomputer in Europe.

The completed system consists of 362,496 cores, capable of executing more than 375 petaflops, with a theoretical peak performance of more than 550 petaflops, which places it among the top five most powerful computers in the world. The November 2022 TOP500 ranks LUMI at number three, with a measured performance of 301.9 PFLOPS.

Architecture 
The system is being supplied by Hewlett Packard Enterprise (HPE), providing an HPE Cray EX supercomputer with next generation 64-core AMD EPYC CPUs and AMD Radeon Instinct GPUs. LUMI is a GPU based system, and the majority of its computing power comes from its GPU cores, an architecture which was chosen primarily for its cost/performance advantage. The system is equipped with 1.75 petabytes of RAM, and storage includes a 7-petabyte partition of flash storage, combined with 80-petabytes of traditional storage, both based on the Lustre parallel file system, as well as a 30-petabyte data management service based on Ceph. This gives the system a total of 117 petabytes of storage with an aggregated I/O bandwidth of 2 terabytes per second.

Funding 
LUMI is co-funded by the EuroHPC Joint Undertaking and the LUMI Consortium, which is composed of the following countries: Finland, Belgium, Czech Republic, Denmark, Estonia, Iceland, Norway, Poland, Sweden, and Switzerland. The total budget is €144.5 million.

Energy 
The computer uses 100% hydroelectric energy, and the heat it generates will be captured and used to heat buildings in the area, making LUMI one of the most environmentally efficient supercomputers in the world. The former UPM paper mill where LUMI is located had only a single 2 minute power outage during its 38 years of operations thanks to the site's reliable connection to the national grid.

Operation 
Half of LUMI's capacity belongs to the EuroHPC Joint Undertaking, 20% of which is reserved for industry and SME use. The other half is shared among the LUMI Consortium countries, according to each country’s financial contribution.

By June 2021 pilot projects had been selected for the first run of the CPU partition, scheduled for September 2021, with full operations including the GPU partition planned for 2022.

Naming 
The word "lumi" means "snow" in Finnish.

See also 
 Leonardo, another EuroHPC supercomputer under construction in Bologna, Italy
 EuroHPC (European High-Performance Computing Joint Undertaking).

References 

Cray products
Petascale computers
Supercomputing in Europe
Kajaani
Information technology in Finland